Bell River may refer to:
 Bell River (New South Wales), Australia
 Bell River (Quebec), Canada
 Bell River (Yukon), a river of Yukon, Canada
 Bell River (South Africa)
 Bell River (Michigan), USA

See also 
 Belle River (disambiguation)